Propatylnitrate (propatyl nitrate) is a nitrate.

References

Nitrate esters